The Sparta Teapot Museum of Craft and Design  was a museum in Sparta, North Carolina, United States.  It closed in January 2010.

The museum drew mainly from the teapot collection of Gloria and Sonny Kamm. The Kamm Collection, comprising more than 6,000 teapots, is the largest teapot collection in the United States and arguably the world.

The Sparta Teapot Museum received its official 501(c)(3) status from the Internal Revenue Service in November 2005. This designation made the Museum a charity organization.

In 2006, in what was criticized by state Republican legislators as an example of pork barrel spending, the North Carolina legislature controversially appropriated funds construction of a new building for the museum. The project was located in Sparta, North Carolina, in order to attract tourists to an economically distressed area of the state, and was supported by local leaders, many of them Republican.

See also
American tea culture
Flagstaff House
Teapot Dome Service Station, an American building shaped like a teapot, symbolic of the Teapot Dome bribery scandal

References

External links
Steeped in Surprises The Story of the Sparta Teapot Museum (2011), YouTube video
Kamm Teapot Foundation

Defunct museums in North Carolina
Museums in Alleghany County, North Carolina
Art museums and galleries in North Carolina
Decorative arts museums in the United States
Charities based in North Carolina
American pottery
Art museums disestablished in 2010
2010 disestablishments in North Carolina
Teapots
Ceramics museums in the United States